Sugar Valley may refer to a place in the United States:

Sugar Valley, Georgia
Sugar Valley, Ohio
Sugar Valley, Pennsylvania
Sugar Valley, Pleasants County, West Virginia
Sugar Valley, Preston County, West Virginia
Sugar Valley Airport, North Carolina